Hladosove is a settlement in Horlivka municipality of Donetsk Oblast of eastern Ukraine, at 61.1 km NNE from the centre of Donetsk city.

The settlement was taken under control of pro-Russian forces during the War in Donbass, that started in 2014. Ukrainian troops took the settlement under their control in November 2017 (together with Travneve). Power supply to Hladosove (and Travneve) was completely restored on 28 December 2017.

Hladosove was reportedly captured by the Donetsk People's Republic around 10 August 2022, during the Eastern Ukraine offensive of the 2022 Russian invasion of Ukraine.

Demographics
Native language as of the Ukrainian Census of 2001:
Ukrainian 81.82%
Russian 18.18%

References

Villages in Bakhmut Raion